Bristow is an unincorporated community in Clark Township, Perry County, in the U.S. state of Indiana.

History
Bristow was platted in 1875. The name Bristow honors a family of early settlers. A post office has been in operation at Bristow since 1879.

Geography

References

Unincorporated communities in Perry County, Indiana
Unincorporated communities in Indiana